Miltochrista calamina is a moth of the family Erebidae. It was described by Arthur Gardiner Butler in 1877. It is found in the Russian Far East (Middle Amur, Primorye, southern Sakhalin, Kunashir), Japan and possibly China and Korea.

References

 Arctiidae genus list at Butterflies and Moths of the World of the Natural History Museum

calamina
Moths described in 1877
Moths of Asia